Kenilworth is a market town and civil parish in the Warwick District in Warwickshire, England,  south-west of Coventry,  north of Warwick and  north-west of London. At the 2021 Census, the population was 22,538. The town is home to the ruins of Kenilworth Castle and Kenilworth Abbey.

History

Medieval and Tudor

A settlement existed at Kenilworth by the time of the 1086 Domesday Book, which records it as Chinewrde.

Geoffrey de Clinton (died 1134) initiated the building of an Augustinian priory in 1122, which coincided with his initiation of Kenilworth Castle. The priory was raised to the rank of an abbey in 1450 and suppressed with the Dissolution of the Monasteries in the 1530s. Thereafter, the abbey grounds next to the castle were made common land in exchange for what Robert Dudley, 1st Earl of Leicester used to enlarge the castle. Only a few walls and a storage barn of the original abbey survive.

During the Middle Ages, Kenilworth played a significant role in the history of England: Between June and December 1266, as part of the Second Barons' War, Kenilworth Castle underwent a six-month siege, when baronial forces allied to Simon de Montfort, were besieged in the castle by the Royalist forces led by Prince Edward, this is thought to be the longest siege in Medieval English history. Despite numerous efforts at taking the castle, its defences proved impregnable. Whilst the siege was ongoing King Henry III held a Parliament at Kenilworth in August that year, which resulted in the Dictum of Kenilworth; a concillatory document which set out peace terms to end the conflict between the barons and the monarchy. The barons initially refused to accept, but hunger and disease eventually forced them to surrender, and accept the terms of the Dictum.

During the Wars of the Roses in the 15th century, Kenilworth Castle served as an important Lancastrian base in the Midlands: The Lancastrian King Henry VI and his wife, Margaret of Anjou spent much time here.

Elizabeth I visited Robert Dudley, 1st Earl of Leicester at Kenilworth Castle several times, the last in 1575. Dudley entertained the Queen with pageants and banquets costing some £1,000 per day that surpassed anything seen in England before. These included fireworks.

Near the castle there is a group of thatched cottages called 'Little Virginia': According to local legend they gained this name because the first potatoes brought to England by Sir Walter Raleigh from the New World were planted and grown here in the 16th century. Modern historians however consider this unlikely, and have suggested that the name may have originated from early colonists to America returning to England from Virginia.

17th and 18th centuries
During the English Civil War, Kenilworth Castle, was occupied by Parliamentarians, after the Royalist garrison was withdrawn. After the end of the war, the castle's defences were slighted on the orders of Parliament in 1649, after which the castle became a ruin.

In 1778 Kenilworth windmill was built. In 1884, it was converted into a water tower, by the addition of a large water tank on the top of the tower in the place of the sails. It continued to be the town's main water supply until 1939, and finally became disused in 1960. It is still a local landmark, but is now a private home.

19th century to present
With the demise of the defensive role of the castle, Kenilworth had ceased to be a place of national significance, but Sir Walter Scott's 1821 novel Kenilworth brought it back to public attention, and helped establish the ruins of the castle as a major tourist attraction.

In the early 19th century Kenilworth was known for its horn comb making industry, which peaked in the 1830s.

Kenilworth was revolutionised by the arrival in 1844 of the railway to the town, when the London and Birmingham Railway opened the Coventry to Leamington Line, including Kenilworth railway station. This closed to all traffic on 3 March 1969. The railway station was located to the south of the Finham Brook valley, and this caused the focus of settlement at Kenilworth to move south, away from the castle, and nearer to the railway station, industrialists from Birmingham and Coventry arrived, who developed the area around the town's railway station with residential and commercial developments. In the 19th century Kenilworth had some fine large mansions with landscaped gardens; these were demolished after the First World War and Second World War for housing developments. The railway also brought a number of new industries to Kenilworth, such as tanning, brick making, and chemicals, and also caused substantial growth in Kenilworth's market gardening; which became known for producing crops such as tomatoes and strawberries.

The town's growth occasioned the addition of a second Church of England parish church, St John's, which is on Warwick Road in Knights Meadow. It was designed by Ewan Christian and built in 1851–1852 as a Gothic Revival building with a south-west bell tower and broach spire. By the 1870s Kenilworth's population had exceeded 4,000.

During The Blitz in World War II on the night of 21 November 1940, a German aircraft dropped two parachute mines on Kenilworth, the large explosions in the Abbey End area demolished a number of buildings, killing 25 people, and injuring 70 more. The bomb damaged area of the town was redeveloped in the 1960s.

In May 1961, the Kenilworth Society was formed over concerns about a group of 17th-century listed cottages adjacent to Finham Brook in Bridge Street. It sets out to promote awareness of Kenilworth's character and encourage its preservation.

British Rail withdrew passenger services from the Coventry to Leamington Line and closed Kenilworth Station in January 1965 in line with The Reshaping of British Railways report. In May 1977, British Rail reinstated passenger services, but did not reopen Kenilworth station, which became derelict and was eventually demolished. In 2011 Warwick Council granted John Laing plc planning permission to build a new station, It finally reopened in 2018.

In the early 1980s, the town's name was used by one of the first generation of computer retailers, a company called Kenilworth Computers based near the Clock Tower, for its repackaging of the Nascom microcomputer with the selling point that it was robust enough to be used by agriculture.

Kenilworth was struck by an F0/T1 tornado on 23 November 1981, as part of the record-breaking nationwide outbreak on that day.

Modern Kenilworth

Kenilworth is close to the University of Warwick at Gibbet Hill in Coventry  to the north. Kenilworth has several suburbs, which include Borrowell, Castle Green, Crackley, Ladyes Hill, Mill End, Park Hill, St Johns, Whitemoor and Windy Arbour. The town has good transport links to Coventry, Warwick, Leamington Spa and Birmingham.

The principal shopping area of Kenilworth is around Warwick Street, Abbey End and Talisman Square; a 1960s shopping precinct. In 2008 the square was modernised and partly redeveloped to include a new Waitrose supermarket. Kenilworth has been a Fairtrade Town since 2007. The town's public library underwent a renovation in 2021. The Cross, a local pub-restaurant, received a Michelin star in 2015.

Abbey Fields contains the ruins of the historic Kenilworth Abbey as well as St Nicholas church. It contains public amenities such as a swimming pool, a lake, a children's play area, and heritage trails. There are several further public open spaces in Kenilworth; firstly Kenilworth Common, an area of historic common land covering . Secondly, Parliament Piece, a field and nature reserve covering , which according to legend, was where King Henry III held a Parliament in 1266.

In the centre of Kenilworth stands a Kugel ball water feature, called the Millennium Globe.

Kenilworth's clock tower (pictured at top of article) is an important local landmark. It was first built in 1906–1907 by a notable local benefactor George Marshall Turner, as a memorial for his late wife. It stands in a roundabout in the town centre. The top part of the tower was severely damaged in 1940 by World War II bombing and had to be pulled down, it was fully restored in the 1970s. The clock tower is locally listed as a heritage asset by Warwick District Council.

Politics and government
Kenilworth gained a local board of health in 1877, which was converted into an Urban District Council in 1894. Under local government reforms in 1974 Kenilworth Urban District was merged into the new Warwick District along with Warwick and Leamington Spa. The former urban district of Kenilworth was then reconstituted as a successor parish with a Town (parish) Council.

Since 2010 Kenilworth has been part of the Parliamentary constituency of Kenilworth and Southam, prior to that it was part of Rugby and Kenilworth.

Transport
The A46 bypass opened in June 1974. Both Birmingham Airport and the M6, M42 and M40 motorways are within  of the town.

Sport
Kenilworth Town FC, located in Gypsy Lane in the south of the town, played in the Midland Combination until June 2011, when it resigned, preferring to spend money on ground improvements rather than fielding a team. It re-entered the English football pyramid in the 2013–14 season and was placed in the Midland Football League Division 3, the 12th highest tier in the English league system. The stay, however, was brief; the first team again resigned shortly afterwards. The Gypsy Lane ground was purchased in 2018 by Coventry Plumbing F.C., which demolished the clubhouse and built a new one, before starting the 2019–20 season there.
Kenilworth Wardens FC is based at Kenilworth Wardens, a Community Amateur Sports Club in Glasshouse Lane to the east of the town.
Kenilworth RFC is the town's rugby union club. It fields three senior sides and hosts a large minis, juniors and colts section. The ground is also located in Glasshouse Lane.
Kenilworth Tennis, Squash and Croquet Club, in Crackley Lane, has nine tennis courts, five squash and racketball courts and two croquet lawns.
Kenilworth has two cricket clubs: Kenilworth Wardens in Glasshouse Lane fields five senior teams and a juniors section starting from seven years old; Kenilworth Cricket Club fields three senior teams and plays at the Warwick Road ground.
Kenilworth Runners meets at the Wardens. It caters for runners of all ages and abilities.
Octavian Droobers is the local orienteering club, using maps of Abbey Fields and Kenilworth Common on which to stage events.
Kenilworth Wheelers meets all the year round on Saturday and Sunday morning for a road ride. During the summer months, regular evening training rides cater for all abilities from novice to racer.
Abbey Fields Swimming Pool is in Abbey Fields. It has a 25 m by 10 m indoor pool and an outdoor pool open from May to September. It is home to Kenilworth Swimming Club and Kenilworth Masters Swimming Club.
Kenilworth Golf Club features a mature 18-hole parkland course, plus a small six-hole par 3 course.

Two Castles Run
The Two Castles Run began in 1983 as a fun run between Warwick Castle and Kenilworth Castle. It has grown into an English Athletics-licensed run with 3,000 entrants in 2010. In 2010 and 2011 it held the Warwickshire Amateur Athletic Association 10 Kilometre Championship. In 2012 all 4,000 places were sold within 25 hours. The race is organised each June by Kenilworth Rotary Club in conjunction with the Leamington Cycling and Athletic Club.

Arts

Theatres
The Talisman Theatre and Arts Centre, founded as Talisman Players in 1942, moved to its current 156-seat premises in Barrow Road in 1969. It won twelve NODA awards between 2004 and 2018.

The Priory Theatre, founded in 1932 as the Kenilworth Players, uses the former Unitarian/Christadelphian chapel, a Gothic Revival building dating from 1816, which was converted into a 119-seat theatre building in 1945–1946. It was gutted by fire in 1976, but restored and reopened in September 1978.

Kenilworth Arts Festival
The first Kenilworth Festival was held in 1935. After a 70-year interval, it was revived locally in 2005. Between 2005 and 2015, events were held almost every year, with varying success. The company became a social enterprise in 2010. In 2015–16, a new team oversaw a change in direction, with a new name, branding and mission statement, as 'Kenilworth Arts Festival'.

Kenilworth Arts Festival took place again on 19–28 September 2019.

Bonfire Night Fireworks Display

Kenilworth Castle hosts an annual firework display, known as one of the best Bonfire Night firework displays in the UK.

Education
The principal secondary school in Kenilworth is the Kenilworth School and Sixth Form, based at two different sites in the town. There are also a number of schools for primary age children.

Notable people
In order of birth:

Henry III of England (1207–1272) commissioned the Dictum of Kenilworth, which was made public on 31 October 1266.
Edward II of England (1284–1327) was held prisoner in Kenilworth Castle in 1326–1327.
Robert Dudley, 1st Earl of Leicester (1532 or 1533–1588) lived at Kenilworth Castle.
Thomas Underhill (1545–1591) was keeper of the wardrobe at Kenilworth Castle.
Thomas Hearne (1744–1817), landscape artist, painted The Priory Gate at Kenilworth in 1784.
William Field (1768–1851), Unitarian minister and local historian, served the Old Meeting House at Kenilworth from about 1830 to 1850.
Sir Walter Scott's (1771–1832) novel Kenilworth. A Romance appeared anonymously in 1821.
Samuel Butler (1774–1839), classical scholar and bishop, became the incumbent of Kenilworth in 1802.
John Sumner (1780–1862), Archbishop of Canterbury, was born in Kenilworth.
Charles Sumner (1790–1874), religious writer and bishop, was born in Kenilworth.
William Gresley (1801–1876), religious writer and cleric, was born in Kenilworth.
Samuel Carter MP (1805–1878), inherited property in Kenilworth and is buried in the graveyard of St Nicholas. 
Anna Russell (1807–1876), botanist, lived in Kenilworth.
Samuel Hawksley Burbury (1831–1911), mathematician, was born in Kenilworth.
Isabel, Lady Burton (née Arundell, 1831–1896), religious writer and wife of the scholar Richard Francis Burton, was born in Kenilworth.
George Potter (1832–1893), trade unionist, first president of the Trades Union Congress of England and Wales, was born in Kenilworth.
Sir Arthur Sullivan's (1842–1900) long association with vocal music began with a cantata, The Masque at Kenilworth, in 1864.
Jack Burns (1859–1927), Scottish champion golfer, was instrumental in creating the Kenilworth course in 1890.
Oliver Bodington (1859–1936), Paris-based international lawyer and marriage broker, was baptised in Kenilworth.
Edith Emma Cooper (1862–1913) was one half of Michael Field, known as a poet, dramatist and diarist.
Edgar Jepson (1863–1938), writer of crime, adventure and fantasy novels, was born in Kenilworth.
John Siddeley, Lord Kenilworth (1866–1953), motor and aero engineering pioneer, moved to Crackley Hall, Kenilworth, in 1918.
Reginald Lee (1870–1913), surviving crew member of the RMS Titanic, died in Kenilworth.
Walter Ritchie (1919–1991), sculptor, lived and worked in Kenilworth.
Basil Heatley (1933-2019) was a marathon runner and Olympic silver medallist born in Kenilworth.
Andrew Davies (born 1936), is novelist and screenwriter who lives in Kenilworth (the 1995 BBC Pride and Prejudice).
Julia Slingo (born 1950), climate scientist and Dame Commander of the Order of the British Empire, was born in Kenilworth.
Peter Marlow (1952–2016) was a photojournalist and photographer.
Tim Flowers (born 1967 in Kenilworth) is an Association football goalkeeper, notably for Southampton and Blackburn Rovers. He was capped 11 times by England.
Rebecca Probert (born 1973), legal historian and expert on marriage law, lives in Kenilworth with her travel-writer husband Liam D'Arcy Brown.
Kelvin Langmead (born 1985), professional football player for Shrewsbury Town and Northampton Town, was educated at Kenilworth School.
Sarah-Jane Perry (born 1990), professional international squash player, was educated at Kenilworth School.

Twin towns
Kenilworth is twinned with:
 Bourg-la-Reine, Hauts-de-Seine, France
 Eppstein, Hesse, Germany.

Kenilworth also has friendship links with:
 Roccalumera, Italy
 Bo, Sierra Leone, through One World Link (OWL)
 Uyogo, Tanzania

References

Sources

External links

Kenilworth Town Council
Kenilworth The Best Kept Secret in Warwickshire — official Kenilworth town centre website
Kenilworth Chamber of Trade
Geograph photos of Kenilworth and surrounding area
Kenilworth local history articles and books
Kenilworth in the Second World War
Catalogue of the Kenilworth Urban District Council archives held at the Modern Records Centre, University of Warwick
Warwickshire Geological Conservation Group (WGCG) is based in Kenilworth
Kenilworth archives - Our Warwickshire

 
Towns in Warwickshire